Rüssenbach Castle is a levelled water castle situated at a height of  on the northern edge of Rüssenbach, a village in the market borough of Ebermannstadt in the county of Forchheim in the south German state of Bavaria. It was built as a motte castle

The Stiebar von Buttenheim family are recorded as occupants of the castle which was mentioned in 1129 and destroyed in 1525 during the Peasants' Rebellion.

Nothing has survived of the former castle.

Literature 
 
 Hellmut Kunstmann. Die Burgen der südwestlichen Fränkischen Schweiz, Verlag Degener & Co., 1990.

External links 
 

Castles in Bavaria
Motte-and-bailey castles
Forchheim (district)
Ebermannstadt